Jason Davenport (born 4 September 1985) is a former Australian Rules Footballer who played for the Geelong Football Club and Port Adelaide Football Club in the Australian Football League (AFL).

Career
A former basketballer and sprinter in his junior days, Davenport was a late-comer to football, but excelled in his early years of exposure to the game. In 2005 he made his local leagues (Ellinbank & District Football League) team of the year, named on the wing after a stellar season with his home club Nilma Darnum where he won the club best and fairest. He then went on to playing as a top-up player for 's VFL side in 2006, and he impressed with his dynamic game, where he has made his name as a goal-kicking wingman. He won the VFL's Fothergill-Round Medal as the league's best young talent, before being picked up with the Geelong's 38th pick in the 2006 Rookie Draft.

In 2007, he was named in the VFL's Team of the Year and came 3rd in the Geelong VFL best and fairest. After being part of Geelong's premiership winning VFL team, in October 2007 Davenport was elevated to the Cats' senior list for the 2008 AFL season. Steven King previously wore the number 1 guernsey for Geelong, and after being traded to St Kilda, King requested that Davenport wear the number 1 guernsey.

In 2008, Davenport won the VFL best and fairest at the Cats, but was delisted at the conclusion of the season after just one year on the senior list. He was later drafted by the Port Adelaide Football Club with pick #78 in the 2008 AFL Draft. He was delisted by Port Adelaide at the end of the 2011 AFL season.

After his AFL career, Davenport joined the North Shore Football Club, where he played and served as senior coach until 2017. 

In August 2020, Davenport was let go due to the COVID-19 Pandemic and took up a role with the Oakleigh Chargers in the NAB League.

References

External links

1985 births
Living people
Australian rules footballers from Victoria (Australia)
Port Adelaide Football Club players
Port Adelaide Football Club players (all competitions)
West Adelaide Football Club players